Wege is a surname. Notable people with the surname include:

Bud VanDeWege (born 1958), American basketball coach
Gary van der Wege (born 1955), American wheelchair fencer
Juliet Wege (born 1971), Australian botanist
Kevin Van De Wege (born 1974), American firefighter and politician